Stanisław Kowalski (14 April 1910 – 5 April 2022) was a Polish supercentenarian masters athlete who, at the age of 105, became the oldest ever competing athlete in the newly formed M105 age division (ages 105–109) in sprinting, shot put and discus throw.

Early life
Kowalski was born on 14 April 1910, in the village of Rogówek, then part of Congress Poland within the Russian Empire, where he lived until the end of the 1930s. After his marriage, he moved to Brzeźnica. In 1952, due to the broadening of the boundaries of the military training ground, he had to move out of his newly built house and live in Lower Silesia, in the village of Krzydlina Wielka, where he ran a small farm and worked as a railroad lineman. He lived in Świdnica from 1979 until his death. Kowalski's mother lived to be 99. For decades, Kowalski rode to work on a bicycle regardless of the weather outside.

Masters athlete career
When he competed at the Polish Veterans Championships on 28 June 2015 in Toruń, Poland, he became the world's oldest athlete. On that day, Kowalski ran the 100 metres in 34.50, put the shot  and threw the discus .  
  
By competing in those events, he surpassed the accomplishments of American John Whittemore, who competed at 104 years 10 months.  By virtue of his age being beyond 105 years old, he necessitated the creation of a new age division for World Masters Athletics, the M105 division was created and he was the only member to have competed.  Thus all of his performances are world records. Hidekichi Miyazaki, a Japanese M100 sprinter, turned 105 on 22 September 2015 and two days later joined Kowalski as the second competitor in the division, although Kowalski was 77 days older when he competed. Miyazaki died on 23 January 2019. 
 
At the age of 104, Kowalski was lauded as the oldest person in Europe to run 100m after running a race in Wroclaw, Poland, on 10 May 2014. He finished in 32.79 seconds, beating the previous record holder, aged 96 at the time, by over a second.  He credited his longevity to never going to the physician and doing whatever he wanted. He also said not to eat much during the evening.

Longevity
On 14 April 2010, Kowalski turned 100 years old, becoming a centenarian. He became the oldest living man in Poland after the death of 108 year old Józef Żurek on 20 March 2018. On 14 April 2020, he turned 110 years old, becoming a supercentenarian. He died on 5 April 2022, 

Additional 
 List of centenarian masters track and field athletes

Notes

References

1910 births
2022 deaths
Polish supercentenarians
Polish masters athletes
Polish male sprinters
Polish male shot putters
Polish male discus throwers
Men supercentenarians
World record holders in masters athletics
People from Końskie County